The 2000 United States presidential election in the District of Columbia took place on November 7, 2000, as part of the 2000 United States presidential election. Voters chose three representatives, or electors to the Electoral College, who voted for president and vice president.

District of Columbia voted by an extremely large margin in favor of the Democratic candidate Al Gore with 85.16% of the vote. Bush got 8.95% with 18,073 votes compared to Nader who got 5.24% with 10,576 votes. A total of 44% of the population came out to vote. The District of Columbia has never voted for a Republican, however, one Democratic elector abstained bringing the district's electoral vote total down from 3 to 2.

Results

See also
 United States presidential elections in the District of Columbia

Footnotes

References

2000
District of Columbia
2000 elections in Washington, D.C.